Leptynoma is a genus of wormlion in the family Vermileonidae.

Species
Leptynoma appendiculata (Bezzi, 1926)
Leptynoma hessei (Stuckenberg, 1961)
Leptynoma maculata (Stuckenberg, 1961)
Leptynoma kirkspriggsi Stuckenberg, 1998
Leptynoma monticola Stuckenberg, 2000
Leptynoma phantasma Stuckenberg, 1996
Leptynoma sericea Westwood, 1876

References

Diptera of Africa
Brachycera genera
Taxa named by John O. Westwood
Vermileonomorpha